Oceaniopteris is a genus of ferns in the family Blechnaceae, subfamily Blechnoideae, according to the Pteridophyte Phylogeny Group classification of 2016 (PPG I). The genus is accepted in a 2016 classification of the family Blechnaceae, but other sources sink it into a very broadly defined Blechnum, equivalent to the whole of the PPG I subfamily.

Species
, using the PPG I classification system, the Checklist of Ferns and Lycophytes of the World accepted the following species:

Oceaniopteris cartilaginea (Sw.) Gasper & Salino
Oceaniopteris ciliata (T.Moore) Gasper & Salino
Oceaniopteris egregia (Copel.) Gasper & Salino
Oceaniopteris francii (Rosenst.) Gasper & Salino
Oceaniopteris gibba (Labill.) Gasper & Salino
Oceaniopteris obtusata (Labill.) Gasper & Salino
Oceaniopteris vittata (Brack.) Gasper & Salino
Oceaniopteris whelanii (F.M.Bailey) Gasper & Salino

References

Blechnaceae
Fern genera